The Transformers: Last Stand of the Wreckers is a mini-series from IDW Publishing's The Transformers, centering on the Autobot team known as the Wreckers.

Summary

References

External links
IDW Catalogue

Last Stand Of The Wreckers
2010 comics debuts
2010 comics endings